Lillebror is a children's song wit lyrics and music by Gullan Bornemark, published in Hallå, hallå in 1964. Compared to the original version, the lyrics have been changed a little bit later. The inspiration to the lyrics game from the Gullan's daughter's Eva's baby brother Sven, who thought he could do anything.

Publication
Hallå, hallå, 1964
Barnens svenska sångbok, 1999, under the lines "Sånger för småfolk".

Recordings
Together with Malmö snurrorkester Gullan Bornemark recorded the song at the "Gumman i lådan" single together with her children Eva and Sven.

References

Barnens svenska sångbok (1999)

1964 songs
Swedish-language songs
Swedish children's songs